Ursoaia River may refer to the following rivers in Romania:

 Ursoaia, tributary of the Ilva
 Ursoaia, tributary of the Trotuș River, also called Popeni River
 Ursoaia Mare River, a tributary of the Prahova River
 Ursoaia Mică River, a tributary of the Prahova River

See also 
 Ursoaia (disambiguation)
 Ursoiu River
 Ursu River (disambiguation)